Mudugere  also known as  Mudigere  is a village in the southern state of Karnataka, India. It is located in the Gauribidanur taluk of Chikkaballapura district in Karnataka. It is situated 7 km away from sub-district headquarter Gauribidanur and 45 km away from district headquarter Chikkaballapura

Demographics
According to Census 2011 information the location code or village code of Mudugere village is 623208. As per 2009 stats, Mudugere village is also a gram panchayat, it contains five villages under Mudugere Gram Panchayat.

The total geographical area of village is 537.52 hectares. Mudugere has a total population of 2,490 peoples with 1,249 males and 1,241 females. There are about 633 houses in Mudugere village. Gauribidanur is nearest town to Mudugere which is approximately 7 km away.

Facilities
Mudugere has below types of facilities.

 Government higher primary School – The school is owned by government of Karnataka, located in Mudugere itself.
 Mudugere Gram panchayat office (mandal office)
 Mudugere KMF (Karnataka Milk Federation) Dairy
 Government grocery store – Owned by government of Karnataka.
 Indian Oil Petrol Pump
 National Highway-206 – Connects Gauribidanur and Madhugiri.
 library

Temples 
 Sri Chennakeshava Temple
 Yasinsha Wali and Mehboobshawali Dargha
 Hanuman Temple
 Shiva Temple
 Suppalamma Temple
 Mosque

References

External links
 https://chikkaballapur.nic.in/en/

Villages in Chikkaballapur district